Michaël Bruno Dominique Cuisance (born 16 August 1999) is a French professional footballer who plays as a midfielder for  club Sampdoria, on loan from Serie B club Venezia. He has also represented France up to the under-20 level.

Early life
Cuisance was born and raised in Strasbourg, Alsace.

Club career

Early career
Cuisance progressed through AS Nancy's youth academy.

Borussia Mönchengladbach
On 9 May 2017, Cuisance signed for Bundesliga club Borussia Mönchengladbach. He made his first team debut on 19 September 2017 in a 2–0 home win against VfB Stuttgart in the league. He came on at halftime, replacing Christoph Kramer.

Cuisance was voted Mönchengladbach's player of the year for the 2017–18 season, as he produced many excellent performances from midfield for the club.

Bayern Munich
On 17 August 2019, Cuisance signed for Bundesliga club Bayern Munich for a fee of nearly €10 million until 2024. He made his debut on 31 August in a 6–1 win against Mainz 05, when he came on as a substitute for Thiago in the 79th minute. On 27 June 2020, Cuisance scored his first Bundesliga goal in a 4–0 win against VfL Wolfsburg.

On 4 July 2020, Cuisance won the 2019–20 DFB-Pokal cup when he was named as an unused substitute in the 4–2 victory against Bayer Leverkusen. On 23 August, he became a Champions League winner, as an unused sub, in a 1–0 win against PSG in the UEFA Champions League final, the win saw Cuisance complete the treble after winning the 2019–20 Bundesliga with the side.

He also won the 2020 UEFA Super Cup on 24 September 2020, when he was named as an unused substitute in the 2–1 win against Sevilla.

On 1 October 2020, he failed a medical test prior to a proposed transfer to Leeds United; thus, he remained at Bayern Munich. Cuisance however claimed after signing for Marseille that he did not fail the medical at Leeds, with Marseille's Head of Football stating "We did not find any issues with his medical", "He is completely available, at 100 per cent."

Marseille (loan) 
On 5 October 2020, Cuisance joined Marseille on a one-year loan with an option to buy. He scored his first goal for the club, an 88th-minute winner, after coming on a substitute in a 1–0 win over Rennes on 10 March 2021.

Venezia 
On 3 January 2022, Cuisance signed for Venezia until 2025.

Sampdoria (loan) 
On 30 January 2023, Cuisance joined Sampdoria on a loan without an option to buy.

International career
Cuisance has represented France up until France U20's level. He was named in the UEFA European Under-19 Championship Team of the Tournament during the 2018 tournament whilst playing for France U19's.

He was selected by Coach Bernard Diomède in the squad for the 2019 FIFA U-20 World Cup where Cuisance scored two goals and gained one assist in his 4 appearances in the tournament.

In July 2020, Cuisance revealed to L'Equipe that he was aiming to play regularly at Bayern Munich to gain a place in the France senior national side.

Style of play
Cuisance is a creative player who plays as a central midfielder, he can also play as a attacking midfielder or as a deep-lying midfielder. His style of play was compared to Mesut Özil by Bundesliga official site. With Bayern Munich Sporting Director Hasan Salihamidzic describing of Cuisance that 'Michaël's strengths are in his possession of the football. He has a great technique, a strong left foot and a great mentality'.

Cuisance cites his idol as former France international midfielder Zinedine Zidane.

Career statistics

Honours
Bayern Munich II
3. Liga: 2019–20
 
Bayern Munich
Bundesliga: 2019–20
DFB-Pokal: 2019–20
UEFA Champions League: 2019–20
UEFA Super Cup: 2020

Individual
Borussia Mönchengladbach Player of the Season: 2017–18
UEFA European Under-19 Championship Team of the Tournament: 2018

References

External links

1999 births
Living people
Footballers from Strasbourg
French footballers
Association football midfielders
Borussia Mönchengladbach II players
Borussia Mönchengladbach players
FC Bayern Munich footballers
FC Bayern Munich II players
Olympique de Marseille players
Venezia F.C. players
U.C. Sampdoria players
Regionalliga players
Bundesliga players
3. Liga players
Ligue 1 players
Serie A players
Serie B players
UEFA Champions League winning players
France youth international footballers
French expatriate footballers
Expatriate footballers in Germany
Expatriate footballers in Italy
French expatriate sportspeople in Germany
French expatriate sportspeople in Italy